Ghilherme Lobo Putini (born February 8, 1995) is a Brazilian actor. He is best known for the short film I Don't Want to Go Back Alone and the film The Way He Looks, in which he played Leo, a blind, gay teenage boy.

Biography 
Ghilherme has six siblings and comes from an artistic family: his father is a musician and his mother is a singer. His artistic training comes from dance. He began dancing at age eight with Ballet Stagium in São Paulo. He moved to the Cisne Negro Companhia de Dança, where he remained until age 13.

Filmography

References

External links 

1995 births
Living people
Male actors from São Paulo
Brazilian people of Italian descent
Brazilian male film actors
Brazilian male television actors
Brazilian male stage actors
21st-century Brazilian male actors